El Piñón is a town and municipality of the Colombian Department of Magdalena. Officially founded in 1760 by Francisco Sayas, Ignacio Crespo, Vicente De la Hoz and others. On April 20, 1915 was proclaimed a municipality. Its economy is based on agriculture and farming. Its main tourist attraction is the Iglesia San Pedro Mártir (Saint Peter the Martir Church) and the Ave Maria Monument. The town celebrates carnivals, the Saint Peter of Verona Day in April, El Milagroso in September, the Unedited Song Festival and the Decimates Festival.

Corregimientos

Campoalegre
Cantagallar
Carreto
Playón de Orozco
Sabanas
San Basilio
Tío Gollo
Veranillo
Vásquez

References

External links
El Piñón official website
Gobernacion del Magdalena - El Piñón

Municipalities of Magdalena Department